The Mayor of Hsinchu is the chief executive of the government of Hsinchu City. This list includes mayors of the city's  provincial era (1982 – present).

Provincial era

Timeline

External links 
 The Mayor - Hsinchu City Government

Hsinchu